Raduzhny Urban Okrug is the name of several municipal formations in Russia. The following administrative divisions are incorporated as such:
City of okrug significance of Raduzhny, Khanty-Mansi Autonomous Okrug
Closed Administrative-Territorial Formation of Raduzhny, Vladimir Oblast

See also
Raduzhny (disambiguation)

References